, also known as , was a Japanese samurai daimyō in the Edo period.

Daimyo
Narishige was head of the Uto Domain (30,000 koku) in Higo Province and head of a cadet branch of the Hosokawa clan.

References

External links
 "Uto" at Edo 330
  Uto City Digital Museum 

1755 births
1835 deaths
Daimyo
Higo-Hosokawa clan